Naushad Ali (25 December 1919 – 5 May 2006) was an Indian music director for Hindi films. He is widely considered to be one of the greatest and foremost music directors of the Hindi film industry. He is particularly known for popularising the use of classical music in films.

His first film as an independent music director was Prem Nagar in 1940. His first musically successful film was Rattan (1944), followed by 35 silver jubilee hits, 12 golden jubilee and 3 diamond jubilee mega successes. Naushad was conferred the Dadasaheb Phalke Award and the Padma Bhushan in 1981 and 1992 respectively for his contribution to the Hindi film industry.

Early life and education
Naushad Ali was born and raised in Lucknow, a city with a long tradition as a centre of Indian Muslim culture. His father, Wahid Ali, was a munshi (court clerk). As a child, Naushad would visit the annual fair at the Deva Sharif in Barabanki, 25 km from Lucknow, where all the great qawwals and musicians of those days would perform before the devotees. He studied Hindustani music there under Ustad Ghurbat Ali, Ustad Yusuf Ali, Ustad Babban Saheb and others. He also repaired harmoniums.

As a lad, he joined a junior theatrical club and was appointed the club's music maestro for their theatrical presentations. He used to watch silent films at the Royal theatre in Lucknow. Theatre owners would hire a team of musicians to play the tabla, harmonium, sitar and violin. The musicians would watch the film first, make notes, finalize the scales required. When the show began in the evening, they would sit in front of the screen and play music for the scenes. This was a great way to be entertained and learn music at the same time. It made him grasp the nuances required in composing a film's background music score.

In time Naushad formed his own Windsor Music Entertainers or just Windsor Entertainers, so named because he had seen the word "Windsor" around Lucknow and liked its ring. It led to the Indian Star Theatrical Company in a theatre at Golaganj colony in Lucknow. He was trained under Laddan Khan until he became capable of working independently as a composer. There he also developed the sense to pick rare musical jewels from the folk tradition of Punjab, Rajasthan, Gujarat and Saurashtra during the company's sojourns in those regions. The travelling players got as far as Viramgam in Gujarat, where they discovered penury, even after selling off theatrical props and musical instruments. The company limped back to Lucknow through the kindness of one of Naushad's friends.

Naushad had already become a cinema fan in the silent era and then, in 1931, Indian cinema got voice and music that further fascinated the 13-year-old boy. He learnt classical and folk music against the wishes of his father. He moved to Mumbai in late 1937 for a career as a musician.

Career
In Mumbai, he initially stayed with an acquaintance from Lucknow (U.P.) at Colaba and after a while, shifted to Dadar opposite the Broadway theatre where he would sleep on the footpath. He assisted music director Ustad Jhande Khan who was at the peak of his success those days, at a monthly salary of Rs 40. 

Then he worked on a film with a Russian producer with the studio located at Chembur. This film could not be completed. Naushad was a piano player so he worked as a pianist in composer Ustad Mushtaq Hussain's orchestra. He then polished off an unfinished film score and got a credit as assistant to Mushtaq Hussain. Then the film company collapsed. Composer Khemchand Prakash took him on as his assistant for the film Kanchan at Ranjit Studios at a salary of Rs 60 per month, for which Naushad remained extremely grateful and in interviews, he had called Khemchand his guru.

His friend, lyricist D. N. Madhok, trusted Naushad's unusual talent for composing music and introduced him to various film producers. Chandulal Shah, the owner of Ranjit Studios, offered to sign Naushad for one of his forthcoming films. Naushad composed a thumri for this film, "Bata de koi kaun gali gaye Shyam", but the film never went into production. He was assistant music director for the Punjabi film Mirza Sahib (1939).

He composed for his first independent film Prem Nagar in 1940 that had a story set in Kutch for which he did a lot of research into the folk music of the area. With A.R. Kardar's film Nayi Duniya (1942), he got first credit as "music director" and he began to work regularly for Kardar Productions. He, however, had a flexibility that he could work outside Kardar Productions and this arrangement continued throughout his career. He first got noticed with A.R. Kardar's film Sharda (1942) wherein 13-year-old Suraiya debuted with the song "Panchhi Ja" for the playback for heroine Mehtab. It was Rattan (1944) that took Naushad right to the top and enabled him to charge Rs 25,000 a film during those days.

Film expert and author Rajesh Subramanian opines that Kardar productions spent Rupees seventy five thousand in 1944 to make Rattan. The music by Naushad saheb was such a phenomenal hit that the company earned Rs 3 lacs as royalty from gramophone sales in the first year.

But his Lucknow-based family remained against music and Naushad had to hide from his family the fact that he composed music. When Naushad got married, the band was playing the tunes of the super hit songs of Naushad's film 'Rattan'. While Naushad's father and father-in-law were condemning the musician who had composed these songs, Naushad dared not tell them that it was he who had composed the music. Naushad understood Hindu and Muslim culture and the languages of those cultures.
 
From 1942 until the late 1960s, he was one of the top music directors in Hindi films. While he did 65 films during his lifetime, 26 of those films celebrated Silver jubilees (25 weeks run) – 8 celebrated golden jubilees (50 weeks run) and 4 celebrated diamond jubilees (60 weeks run) – (inclusive count – a diamond jubilee film also celebrates Silver and Golden jubilees).

Naushad worked with several lyricists, including Shakeel Badayuni, Majrooh Sultanpuri, D. N. Madhok, Zia Sarhadi, Yusufali Kechery and Khumar Barabankvi.

Mother India (1957), for which he had composed music, was the first Indian film that got nominated for an Oscar award.

In 1981, Naushad was awarded the Dadasaheb Phalke Award for his lifetime contribution to Indian cinema.

He composed the tunes of Taj Mahal: An Eternal Love Story (2005) at the age of 86.

Amongst his assistants, Mohammed Shafi, Jerry Amaldev and Ghulam Mohammed stand out prominently.

The songs Naushad composed for the 1988 Malayalam film Dhwani which were sung by P. Suseela & K. J. Yesudas are evergreen superhits that Malayalis do repeatedly listen to even after 3 decades.

Five films have been made on his life and work. Biographical books published are Dastaan-E-Naushad (Marathi) by Shashikant Kinikar; Aaj Gaawat Man Mero (Gujarati); Hindi and Urdu biographical sketches in Shama & Sushma Magazines respectively, titled "Naushad Ki Kahani, Naushad Ki Zubani"; the last one was translated into Marathi by Shashikant Kinikar. Kinikar also came up with a book titled "Notes of Naushad" which puts together some interesting anecdotes of Naushad's life.

Naushad also composed background music for the TV serial "Akbar The Great" telecast in 1988 which was directed by Akbar Khan, brother of Hindi film stars Sanjay Khan and Feroze Khan as was also The Sword of Tipu Sultan produced and directed by Sanjay Khan and Akbar Khan which was telecast in 1990 and became very popular.

Death and legacy
Naushad died on 5 May 2006 in Mumbai due to cardiac arrest at age 86. He was buried at the Juhu Muslim cemetery.

He is survived by six daughters Zubeda, Fehmida, Farida, Sayeeda, Rashida, and Waheeda and three sons Rehman Naushad, Raju Naushad & Iqbal Naushad. Rehman Naushad being the eldest of all assisted him in some of his films. Also, Naushad composed music for two movies directed by Rahman Naushad, My Friend (1974) and Teri Payal Mere Geet (1989).

Naushad was ranked as one of the most respected and successful music directors of Indian Film Industry.

Naushad had requested the Maharashtra State Government to sanction a plot for an institution for promoting Hindustani music. This was sanctioned during his lifetime and the 'Naushad Academy of Hindustani Sangeet' was formed.

Writer
Naushad was also a respected and published poet and formally launched his book of Urdu poetry entitled Aathwaan Sur ("The Eighth Note") and the Navras label's album titled "Aathwan Sur – The Other Side of Naushad" having 8 ghazals as part of Hounslow's book fair and festival "Bookmela" in November 1998. The album has lyrics and composition by Naushad, arranged by Uttam Singh.

Track list:
 Aabadiyon Mein Dasht Ka Munzar Bhi Aayega – A. Hariharan – 7:08
 Aaj Ki Baat Kal Pay Kyun Taalo – A. Hariharan & Preeti Uttam Singh – 6:17
 Ghata Chhaayi Thi Saawan Khul Ke Barsa – Preeti Uttam Singh – 7:19
 Kabhi Meri Yaad Unko Aati To Hogi – A. Hariharan & Preeti Uttam Singh – 6:18
 Mujh Ko Muaff Kijiye – A. Hariharan – 5:35
 Peenay Waalay Bekhudi Say Kaam Lay – A. Hariharan & Preeti Uttam Singh – 8:13
 Saawan Kay Jab Baadal Chhaaye – A. Hariharan – 6:50
 Tanhaa Khud Say Baat Karoon – Preeti Uttam Singh – 7:49

Music style
Naushad gave a new trend to popular film music by basing his tunes on classical music ragas and folk music. Naushad was known for his skillful adaptation of the classical musical tradition for movie songs. For some movies like Baiju Bawra, he composed all scores in classical raga modes and arranged for the well-known vocalist Amir Khan to be a music consultant for this film. Naushad could easily work with Western instruments, including the clarinet, the mandolin and the accordion. He could incorporate Western musical idioms in his compositions and compose for Western-style orchestras.

During the early 1940s, recordings were done in quiet parks and gardens after midnight because the studios did not have sound-proof recording rooms. In the gardens, there would be no echo and disturbances, unlike the studios where the sound reverberated because of the tin roofs.

For films like 'Uran Khatola' and 'Amar', he recorded the voice of a particular artiste on a scale of 90, then recorded it on 70, then on 50 and so on. After the complete recording, it was played for the scene and the impact it created was terrific.

He was one of the first to introduce sound mixing and the separate recording of voice and music tracks in playback singing. He was the first to combine the flute and the clarinet, the sitar and mandolin. He also introduced the accordion to Hindi film music and was among the first to focus on background music to extend characters' moods and dialogue through music. But perhaps his greatest contribution was to bring Indian classical music into the film medium. Many of his compositions were inspired by ragas and he even used distinguished classical artistes like Amir Khan and D.V. Paluskar in Baiju Bawra (1952) and Bade Ghulam Ali Khan in Mughal-e-Azam (1960). Baiju Bawra (1952) demonstrated Naushad's grasp of classical music and his ability to bring it to the masses, for which he won the first Filmfare Best Music Director Award in 1954.

Naushad commented on a pre-release meeting about "Baiju Bawra":
“When people heard that the film would be full of classical music and ragas, they protested, ‘People will get a headache and they will run away.’ I was adamant. I wanted to change public taste. Why should people be fed what they like all the time? We presented them with music from our culture and it worked.”

For Aan (1952), he was the first to use a 100-piece orchestra. He was the first composer to have developed the system of western notation in India. The notation for the music of the film 'Aan' was published in book form in London.

In Uran Khatola (1955), he recorded an entire song without the use of orchestra, having replaced the sound of musical instruments with choral sound of humming.

For Mughal-e-Azam (1960) song Ae Mohabbat Zindabad, he used a chorus of 100 persons. 

For Ganga Jamuna (1961), he used lyrics in chaste Bhojpuri dialect.

He used just six instruments in the title song of Mere Mehboob (1963).

In 2004, a colorized version of the classic Mughal-e-Azam (1960) was released, for which Naushad had the orchestral music specially re-created (in Dolby Digital) by today’s industry musicians, while maintaining all the solo vocals from the original soundtrack. To elaborate, the playback vocals (though not the chorus) recorded four decades ago are mixed with orchestra tracks created in the present millennium.

As Indian film music gradually assumed a Western bend starting in the late 1960s, Naushad came to be considered old-fashioned. Composers who could compose rock-and-roll and disco-inflected music started getting increasingly popular. Naushad was still esteemed as a maestro, but his talents were sought mostly for historical movies where traditional scores were appropriate. It can be said of Naushad that in the early days of popular cinema music in the thirties and forties he set the standards for classical and folk music that resonated with the idea of India. In short he brought out the beauty of Indian music in a short film song of a few minutes which was not an easy feat. The composers who followed him were inspired by this aspect of his compositions.

Filmography

Music director

Non-film album
Aathwan Sur - The Other Side of Naushad : This was a Ghazal album released in 1998 and had all its songs composed by Naushad and sung by Hariharan and Preeti Uttam Singh.

Producer
 Maalik (1958) Music Director for this film was Ghulam Mohammed (composer)
 Uran Khatola (1955)
 Babul (1950)

Storywriter
 Palki (1967)
 Teri Payal Mere Geet (1989)

Awards and recognition

 1954: Filmfare Best Music Director Award – Baiju Bawra
 1961: Bengal Film Journalists' Association's 'Best Music Director Award' for film Gunga Jumna (1961)
 1975: "Naushad Ali", a 30-minute documentary film produced by Television Centre, Mumbai
 1981: Dadasaheb Phalke Award
 1984: Lata Mangeshkar Award (Madhya Pradesh State Government's Award)
 1987: Amir Khusrow Award
 1990: Best Music for The Sword of Tipu Sultan TV series
 1992: Sangeet Natak Akademi Award
 1992: Padma Bhushan Award for his lifetime contributions to Indian cinema
 1993: Awadh Ratna Award by Government of Uttar Pradesh
 1994: Maharashtra Gaurav Puruskar Award 
 2000: Screen Lifetime Achievement Award
 2008: The Carter Road situated at Bandra, was renamed as Sangeet Samrat Naushad Ali Marg in his memory

Positions held
 President of Cine Music Directors Association
 Chairman of Indian Performing Rights Society
 President of Maharashtra State Angling Association
 President of Alam-E-Urdu Conference (Delhi)
 The title of Special Executive Magistrate, Mumbai

Bibliography

References

External links

 
Khayyam remembers Naushad
Glowing tribute to Naushad: The Hindu (newspaper)
Pandit Jasraj on Naushad: The Hindu (newspaper)

Naushad Ali Naushad Ali's Relationship with Mohammed Rafi
Fan Site of Naushad
Naushad's book Aathwan Sur
Read a ghazal by Naushad
Naushad's Letterhead

Filmfare Awards winners
Recipients of the Sangeet Natak Akademi Award
Musicians from Lucknow
1919 births
2006 deaths
Dadasaheb Phalke Award recipients
Hindi film score composers
20th-century Indian musicians
Recipients of the Padma Bhushan in arts